Silvano Bores (1855–1903) was an Argentine politician who was Governor of Tucumán Province in the period 17 June 1890 – 16 November 1890.

People from Tucumán Province
Argentine politicians
1855 births
1903 deaths